Olivenebula is a genus of moths of the family Noctuidae.

Species
 Olivenebula confecta (Walker, 1865)
 Olivenebula monticola Kishida & Yoshimoto, 1977
 Olivenebula oberthueri (Staudinger, 1892)
 Olivenebula pulcherrima (Moore, 1867)
 Olivenebula subsericata (Herrich-Schäffer, 1861)
 Olivenebula xanthochloris (Boisduval, 1840)

References
Natural History Museum Lepidoptera genus database
Olivenebula at funet

Hadeninae